Desperation is the third album from Hostyle Gospel. Hostyle Gospel Ministries released the project on August 13, 2013. Hostyle Gospel Ministries worked with Blessing Adeoye Jr., Chivas Hemphill (Chevaltron-X), Scott Degroot, Joel Elam, Lamorax and Sene on the production of this album.

A group member said, "The idea behind this album was to show how broken this world we live in is and how we need a Savior to save us."

Reception

Specifying in a seven star review by Cross Rhythms, Tony Cummings responds, "If you want your spiritual declarations shouted at you and you recognize that all of us are involved in an all-out spiritual battle there's much here on the group's third album to inspire you." Willis Fedd, writes in an 8.3 review from 1truthonline, replying, "Over all this a good album. With it only spanning 12 tracks it allows the listener to stay focused on the message. Lyrically, Hostyle Gospel gives great spiritual references and their delivery is on point. Their music production has definitely increased since their last album and it makes you excited to see what they have in store next." Bob Marovich, indicating in a three star review from The Journal of Gospel Music, recognizing "The album is peppered with fist-pumping, pep rally style chants designed to fire up a crowd to join Hostyle Gospel in taking up the fight."

Track listing

Music videos 

 "Monster" (featuring Lamorax)  
 "Break"

Personnel

Performance 

 Hostyle Gospel - primary artists

Featured artists 

 Blessing Adeoye Jr.
 Joel Elam 
 Lamorax 
 Chivas Hemphill (Chevaltron-X)
 Scott Degroot
 Sene

Production and engineering 

 Fontaine Pizza - engineer, producer
 Raynard Glass - engineer, producer
 Demetrius Morton - producer
 King Son - producer

Packaging 

 Hdavid Garcia - Photography and Graphic Design

References

2013 albums
Hostyle Gospel albums